Fahamu is a not-for-profit organisation committed to serving the needs of organisations and social movements that inspire progressive social change and promote and protect human rights. It has played a pioneering role in using new information and communication technologies to support capacity building and networking between civil society and human rights organisations. Fahamu has offices in the United Kingdom, South Africa, Senegal and Kenya. Fahamu's core tools to build capacity and engage civil and human rights organisations are the publication of Pambazuka News (on-line news and interaction on social justice and development), on-line distance learning courses on human rights and social justice and the application of new technologies such as SMS for information dissemination, lobbying and interaction purposes.

Details
Fahamu was established in the United Kingdom in 1997. Fahamu Ltd was registered and incorporated as a not-for-profit company limited by guarantee in 2001 (no. 4241054). Fahamu Ltd is registered in Kenya as F15/2006. Fahamu Trust was registered as a charity in the UK (no. 1100304) in July 2003, with the following objectives: "the advancement of education of the public worldwide by the publication of electronic newsletters, courses and disseminating of information on human rights". Fahamu SA is registered as a trust in South Africa IT 37201. To enable supporters in the US to contribute to Fahamu's work, Fahamu was established in 2005 as a Global Support Fund of the Tides Foundation, a duly registered public charity, exempt from US Federal income taxation under Sections 501(c)(3) and 509(a)(1) of the Internal Revenue Code.

History

1997–2000
Fahamu was founded, as the Oxford Learning Space, in the year 1997 by Firoze Manji, one of the many exiled Kenyan multiparty democracy and social justice activists of the early 90s, as a response that sought to address social justice and civil freedoms issues with a particular focus on the African continent. The Oxford Learning Space Ltd as an organization initially operated from Manji's home at the time.

Pambazuka News, a newsletter distributed every week by email, was launched in 2000. It provided a platform for discussion and exchange of information on social justice in Africa. Pambazuka was meeting the information need, where it provided alternative media that informed concerned citizens and civil society organisations, which at the time had limited access to the Internet.

Pambazuka News would come to be recognised as a platform that carries editorial, analysis and opinion pieces, as well as summaries of websites and opinion pieces on human rights, conflict, refugees, gender and culture in Africa. Most of Pambazukas writing has come from within Africa.

The Oxford Learning Space as it were, would hence grow to offer basic tools for social justice work; these initially took the form of online courses and on CD-ROM and Social Justice News.

2001–2004
In the year 2001, the Adilisha Project was launched with financial support from European Commission, the British Department for International Development (DFID), and the Canadian International Development Research Centre Development (IDRC).  The grant from the EC was awarded to the University of Oxford while the grants from DFID and the IDRC were awarded to Fahamu. The objective of the project was to strengthen the campaigning, organisational and management capabilities of human rights organisations.  Specifically, the project sought to build the capacity of human rights organisations in the Southern African Development Community (SADC) region.

The project had seven training modules: Fact-finding and Investigation; Leadership and Management; Campaigning and Advocacy; Financial Management; Use of the Internet; Introduction to Human Rights and Monitoring and Reporting on Human Rights Violations.

In May 2002 Fahamu South Africa Trust was established in Durban, South Africa. The Trustees were Firoze Manji, Vinesh Anil Naidoo and Shereen Karmali.  Vinesh Anil Naidoo (VAN) was also the executive director.

In July 2003, Fahamu Trust was registered in the United Kingdom as a charity No. 1100304. On the Board of Trustees were: Belinda Allan (founding member of Refugee Studies Centre, University of Oxford), Paddy Coulter (Director of studies, Reuters Institute), Shereen Karmali (editor and governor Oxford Brookes University), Colin Burton (chartered accountant) and Firoze Manji (executive director).

In May 2004 Fahamu joined the steering committee of the Solidarity for African Women's Rights (SOAWR) coalition and offered Pambazuka News pages and technological support to the coalition to raise public awareness about the Protocol to the African Charter on Human and People's on the Rights of Women in Africa. Fahamu contributed to SOAWR's efforts of persuading governments to ratify that African Union protocol on the Rights of Women in Africa. Several special issues were published and used as advocacy tools including during African Union summits in Addis Ababa , Ethiopia . Fahamu also set up a website for the coalition and developed the facility for people to support the protocol using mobile text messaging (SMS).

Fahamu has been recognised as being at the forefront of e-advocacy not only in African but globally, Fahamu's cell phone campaigns have attracted wide attention in technology circles and among activists who run their advocacy using emerging technology in social justice work. Text messaging campaigns have particularly been successful with the wide spread of cellular technology on the continent.
Fahamu would in the same year receive a Community award for innovations in the use of SMS for advocacy work from AOL, the leading online interactive services provider to the UK, with more than 2.3 million members.

In December 2004 Fahamu would sign an agreement with the Office of UN High Commissioner for Human Rights for development of material – CDROMs – on Prevention of Torture and Conflict Prevention with future translations into French, Spanish and Russian. This was done in collaboration with United Nations System Staff College, Association for the Prevention of Torture and the University of Oxford.  This material was intended to strengthen the capacity of National Human Rights Institutions.

2005–2008
In the year 2005, Fahamu's main focus was still on social justice news dissemination and the Fahamu courses in conjunction with University of Oxford's distant learning summer programs. The courses were put together with the assistance of experts in the human rights field and consultants from the University of Oxford. At this period Fahamu had created a unique niche and was well known for its online courses for Non Governmental Organisation institutions and organizations dealing with Human Rights and related material.

In the year 2005 Fahamu had 12 staff members worldwide, 5 volunteers and 1 intern.  Outside the United Kingdom office were: Patrick Burnett in South Africa, Online News Editor Pambazuka News; Stella Chege, Project Worker, Kenya (there was no physical address at the time); Sokari Ekine, African Blogs Editor, Pambazuka News; Anil Naidoo, Director Fahamu SA; Atieno Ndomo, Regional Correspondent, Pambazuka News.

In May 2005 Fahamu's African Union Monitor was established. 
The AU monitor website and associated mailing list aimed to strengthen the ability of civil society organisations to engage constructively with the African Union to promote justice, equity and accountability. The website would give African CSOs a platform on which they could engage constructively with the AU and its organs from a well-informed point.

Pambazuka News, over this period, experienced a substantial growth in its readership reaching an estimated 100,000 people in African and beyond becoming effectively the leading forum for human rights defenders and others working on social justice in Africa.

2005 would also see Fahamu's first book publication African Voices on Development and Social: editorials from Pambazuka News 2004, by Firoze Manji and Patrick Burnett.

The Fahamu SA Trust office closed in October 2005 due to shortage of funds. Consequently, VAN's tenure as executive director ended. VAN, would however, continue as a Trustee of Fahamu SA.Fahamu SA would go on to move to a new address in Cape Town, in Pambazuka News and Information Coordinator's home; Patrick Burnett's home address.

Stella Chege, Kenyan project worker, would establish the Nairobi office in 2006. Stella had met Firoze Manji, the founder, while undertaking her master's studies in the UK. She was a volunteer with the Fahamu UK office then. She expressed her desire to return home to Kenya and thus initiated the plan for finally actualizing a Fahamu Nairobi office. Stella Chege did the scouting and worked out the formalities of starting a Fahamu office in Nairobi when she came to Kenya. Fahamu was registered in Nairobi in 2006. 
On the tail end of the year, the Nairobi office would explore its mandate in the region with a keen interest in working with Social Movements. The model at this point was training of trainers. This would also include capacity building of community leaders involved in the fields of advocacy and human rights. In some instances the training and courses were ad hoc based.

In Nairobi, 2007 was the year that Fahamo, away from a period-based organization, began its structure with the introduction of the AU monitoring program as a result of Fahamo being part of the SOAWR network. The mission of the AU Fahamu observer was to analyze the actions and activities of the African Union and to disseminate these analyzes as degraded consumer information.

In this same year the strategy of Fahamu in the African continent and abroad was considered. Fahamu would seek to expand its presence in Africa.

Fahamu Nairobi's initial project with the African grassroots constituent involved the hosting of West African Women community groups attending the World Social Forum in Nairobi in 2007. Yves Niyiragira and Winnie Kariuki would render their time as volunteers helping Stella with logistics and other particulars leading up to the World Social Forum.

During this period at the WSF, Fahamu Nairobi was launching its first of the series on China in Africa books. Publishing and press was all done in the UK office, Oxford Cornmarket Street. Fahamu Oxford was mostly dealing with press at the time, Pambazuka and the Fahamu online courses.

The courses were marketed in Nairobi where institutions and civil society groups were approached to garner interest in Fahamu's courses particularly the online modules. The three major courses marketed by the Nairobi office at the time were Fundraising and Resource Mobilisation, Introduction to Human Rights and Investigating and Reporting on Human Right Violations.

The genesis of programmatic work dealing with projects in Africa was in the Nairobi office. This was prompted especially by the need to have an office based in Africa since the Fahamu mandate, as a Pan African organisation, was to be primarily dedicated to African issues.

Shortly after the WSF, Fahamu with Tactical Tech facilitated a mobile activists workshop, which attracted IT specialists involved in advocacy from across the continent and beyond. This workshop was meant to show how technology, especially cellular technology, could be utilized for advocacy. It also was a networking platform that aimed to establish an African regional network of social justice activists who use mobile phone technologies. The workshop would culminate in the development of a mobile-activism toolkit from the contributions of the workshop participants and other experienced NGO practitioners.

Throughout the period between 2006 and 2007 the Dakar office was mostly engaged in the production of the French version of Pambazuka News. It was up until 2010 that "We are the Solution", grassroots women's food sovereignty project was started in Dakar.

In 2007 going into 2008 Fahamu was able to offer scholarships for some of its online courses through a grant to about 30 participants.

Initially, the Fahamu Nairobi offices were in Shelter Afrique, Mamlaka Road and later moved to Peponi Plaza Westlands where they have been to this very day. Hakima Abbas joined Stella and Winnie in the Nairobi office in 2007 from Witness in New York; she had also participated in the Mobile Tool Kit workshop as one of the facilitators. Hakima would work on the AU monitor together with Yves.

Fahamu's engagement with grassroots movements expanded with the Leadership and Management course for rural women through the Maendelo ya Wanawake and Hakima's AU Monitor that had successfully created an interactive platform with Bunge La Mwananchi movement and other grassroots activists. With Alice Nderitu as the Education for Social Justice director, there was a project for community training on Leadership, Communication and Advocacy hosted by the Centre for Multiparty Democracy, the activist Rachel Kabeberi hosted this.

In 2008, Fahamu was still doing courses in the process of programme expansions (There was a move to promote residential courses in 2008). These programmes would later grow to be defined as the Fahamu Pillars.

Fahamu's work would intensify continentally. Besides working with Pambazuka News, the South African office would also play an integral role in the Emerging Powers programme. It was at this time that Fahamu projects would take clearly defined shapes into thematic programmes and would fully be established into pillars by 2010 into what they recognizably are today. 
Fahamu also experienced an expansion of staff with the growing programmes.

Education for Social Justice was then ran by Adilisha's Alice Nderitu, AU projects received funding and took flight; Yves was working with other regional partners like Trust Africa and Heinrich Boll Foundation along the AU lines.

2009–2012
Over the 2009 and 2010, Fahamu started undergoing some funding strategy restructuring process. The conversation in 2009 was around the idea of sustainable and successful handing over of oversight and general organisational direction of the organisation to African nationals.

The concept of having a senior management team who would collectively decide the organisation's direction was carried on having the Editor in Chief of Pambazuka News, Director of Tuliwaza, Finance Director as well as the executive director as part of the senior management.

It was established by the senior management that the organization needed to find some type of financial independence. Firoze Manji, then the executive director, was of the impression that the organisation needed to focus more on creating a business model where the sale of books, news material and advertising space would be the key sources of income.

Firoze Manji resigned form the directorship position and continued serving the organisation in the capacity of Editor in Chief of Pambazuka News. Rebecca Williams (then Finance Director) would become the interim executive director based in Oxford and Hakima Abbas was her deputy (based in Nairobi, Kenya). Hakima Abbas would later take up the executive director position and was the first director to base their operations from the Nairobi office. She would later (2011) be based in Dakar's Fahamu offices.

George Mwai had launched Adilisha's Fellowship Programme earlier in 2011; having taken over from Alice Nderitu.

The programmatic definitions into pillars came about during Hakima Abbas's deputy ED tenure where the different projects and areas of concerns where grouped and under defined themes of concern.

Mission statement
Fahamu supports the strengthening of human rights and social justice movements by:
 promoting innovative use of information and communications technologies
 stimulating debate, discussion and analyses
 publishing news and information
 developing and delivering educational courses, including by distance learning.

Strategy
Fahamu's strategy over the coming years is to:
 expand the forum for human rights and social justice in Africa
 expand public awareness of human rights
 strengthen civil society organisations
 root Fahamu in Africa.

Communications and education
In the 17 years of its existence, Fahamu has made a significant contribution to media and freedom of expression in Africa, using information and communications technologies.

Newsletters
Fahamu's flagship publication, Pambazuka News, an open-access, pan-African email and online newsletter with English, French and Portuguese editions, some 15,000 subscribers and an estimated weekly readership of around 500,000, is generated predominantly in Africa. The 300th issue was published in 2007.
Pambazuka broadcasts feature audio and visual content with commentary and debate from social justice movements across the continent.
Fahamu produces a series of special reports, some of which are published in Pambazuka News, and some of which are made available as separate downloadable documents from the Pambazuka website.
In May 2005, Fahamu established the African Union Monitor. This website and associated electronic mailing list aims to strengthen the ability of civil society organisations to engage constructively with the African Union (AU) and its organs in the interests of promoting justice, equity and accountability through the provision of high-quality and timely information.

Fahamu Books and Pambazuka Press
With bases in Nairobi, Cape Town, Dakar, and Oxford, Pambazuka Press (formerly Fahamu Books) publishes a growing list of book titles on human rights, social justice, politics and advocacy in Africa, written by well-known African academics, public intellectuals and activists.

Fahamu also publish training materials on CD-ROMs to strengthen the capacity of civil society organisations in Africa to promote and protect human rights and to help them become sustainable and effective organisations.
A number of these CD-ROMs are also available as tutored, online courses from Fahamu.
In publishing, Fahamu has partnered with Food First, Grassroots International, Focus on the Global South, Mkuki na nyota, Oozebap, the South Centre and SOAWR.

Selected titles
 No Land! No House! No Vote! Voices from Symphony Way, by the Symphony Way Pavement Dwellers – 2011
 Chinese and African Perspectives on China in Africa, Axel Harneit-Sievers, Stephen Marks, Sanusha Naidu (eds) – 2010
 SMS Uprisings: Mobile Phone Activism in Africa, Sokari Ekine (ed.) – 2010
 The Crash of International Finance-Capital and its Implications for the Third World, Dani Wadada Nabudere – 2009
 Aid to Africa: Redeemer or Coloniser? Hakima Abbas, Yves Niyiragira (eds) – 2009
 Food Rebellions! Crisis and the Hunger for Justice, Eric Holt Giménez, Raj Patel – 2009
 Where is Uhuru? Reflections on the Struggle for Democracy in Africa, Issa G. Shivji – 2009
 Ending Aid Dependence, Yash Tandon – 2008
 China's New Role in Africa and the South, Dorothy Guerrero, Firoze Manji (eds) – 2008
 Africa's Long Road to Rights/ Long trajet de l’Afrique vers les Droits, Hakima Abbas (ed) – 2008
 Silences in NGO Discourse: The Role and Future of NGOs in Africa, Issa G. Shivji – 2007

Fahamu courses
As part of its mission to build the capacity of African human rights and social justice movements, Fahamu develops training materials and runs courses, including by distance learning.
Fahamu provides training to strengthen the capacity of civil society organisations in Africa to promote and protect human rights and to help them become sustainable and effective organisations.

In the teaching of courses, Fahamu works with, amongst others, the University of Oxford and MIT.

Advocacy
Fahamu joined the Solidarity for African Women's Rights (SOAWR), a coalition of 30 women's and international organisations, in 2004 to promote the ratification of the African Union's Protocol on the Rights of Women in Africa. Fahamu offered the pages of Pambazuka News and technological support to the coalition to raise public awareness about the protocol across the continent and to help women bring pressure on their governments to adopt the protocol. Within 15 months, the campaign had succeeded: 15 countries had ratified the protocol, enabling it to come into force across Africa.

As Kenya was plunged into violence following the contested elections in December 2007, Fahamu sought to support independent, progressive voices in Kenya.  Fahamu became actively engaged in the Kenyans for Peace through Truth and Justice coalition. In particular, Fahamu-Kenya became involved in the Direct Action Training workshops initiated by activist and artist Shailja Patel in April 2008. With the support of a New Tactics in Human Rights grant, Fahamu-Kenya is now collaborating with Bunge la Mwananchi (the people's parliament) to train grassroots activists on effective advocacy with the aim of supporting them to lead similar workshops in local communities.

In collaboration with the African Women's Development and Communication Network (FEMNET), Fahamu has established a collaborative network of community radio stations, radio journalists and cartoonists to develop a range of radio plays, current affairs broadcasts and the publication of cartoon books on the Protocol on the Rights of Women in Africa, which will be disseminated in west and east Africa (in the first instance).

Fahamu has used innovative technologies, including SMS (text messaging by mobile phone) as a means of promoting public awareness of social justice issues in Africa. The use of these technologies has been particularly appropriate given the spread of mobile technology on the African continent and the fact that, as communications devices, they have leapfrogged non-existent telephony infrastructure, opening up the potential for communicating with new audiences.

Awards
 PoliticsOnline 2005, 2006, 2007, 2008 (voted one of the top ten websites in the annual 'Top 10 Who Are Changing the World of Internet and Politics')
 Tech Museum Award 2005 (Fahamu was one of five Tech Laureates in the Microsoft Education category.)
 Highway Africa 2005 (Pambazuka News won the non-profit category for the innovative use of new media.)
 GenARDIS 2005 (Fahamu South Africa was one of the 10 winners of the Gender and Agriculture in the Information Society (GenARDIS) Award.)
 Prix Ars Electronica Awards 2005 (honorary mention)
 AOL Innovations in the community Award 2004
 Stockholm Challenge 2004 (runner up for the development of distance learning courses for human rights organisations.)

Partners

References

External links

Fahamu Books Website
Pambazuka News
 Fahamu at SourceWatch

Social welfare charities based in the United Kingdom
Foreign charities operating in South Africa
Foreign charities operating in Kenya
Human rights organisations based in the United Kingdom